Bishop of Concepción may refer to:

Bishop of Concepción, a diocese in the Anglican Church of Chile
Archbishop of Concepción, of the Roman Catholic Archdiocese of Concepción in Chile

See also
Concepción (disambiguation)